Days after the success of the Wuchang Uprising in October of 1911, the Revolutionaries began to spread the revolution to other major cities of China starting from Changsha in Hunan province, not far from Wuhan. The Qing troops were already weakened by their defeat at Wuchang,  therefore making the city easy to capture. 

On October 22, 1911 the Hunan Tongmenghui members were led by Jiao Dafeng (焦達嶧) and Chen Zuoxin (陳作新).  They led an armed group consisting partly of revolutionaries from Hongjiang and partly of New Army units in a campaign to extend the uprising into Changsha. They then captured the city and killed the local Qing Imperial general. Then they announced the establishment of "Hunan Military Government of the Republic of China", and announced their opposition to the Qing Dynasty and support for a Chinese republic.

References 

Changsha
1911 in China
1911 Revolution
Changsha